Yelena Nanaziashvili (born 23 January 1981) is a Kazakhstani long distance runner. She competed in the women's marathon at the 2017 World Championships in Athletics.

References

External links

1981 births
Living people
Kazakhstani female long-distance runners
Kazakhstani female marathon runners
World Athletics Championships athletes for Kazakhstan
Place of birth missing (living people)
21st-century Kazakhstani women